Selina Annamaria Kuster (born 8 August 1991) is a Swiss football defender currently playing for FC Zürich in the Nationalliga A.

She has been a member of the Swiss national team since 2009. As an under-20 international she played the 2010 U-20 World Cup.

References

External links
 Profile at FC Zürich 

1991 births
Living people
Swiss women's footballers
Switzerland women's international footballers
2015 FIFA Women's World Cup players
Sportspeople from the canton of St. Gallen
Women's association football defenders
Swiss Women's Super League players
FC Zürich Frauen players
Grasshopper Club Zürich (women) players
21st-century Swiss women